Paul Kaye (born 1964) is an English comedian and actor.

Paul Kaye or Paul Kay may also refer to:

 Paul Kaye (broadcaster) (1934–1980), British radio broadcaster
 Sir Paul Kaye, 5th Baronet (born 1958), of the Kaye baronets
 Paul Kay (born 1934), American linguistics scholar
 Paul Kay (soccer) (born 1962), Australian footballer